The 1937–38 Temple Owls men's basketball team represented Temple University during the 1937–38 NCAA men's basketball season in the United States. The head coach was James Usilton, coaching in his 12th season with the Owls. The team finished the season with a 23–2 record and was retroactively named the national champion by the Helms Athletic Foundation and the Premo-Porretta Power Poll. They won the Eastern Intercollegiate Conference title with a 9–1 record, and the Owls also won the first-ever National Invitation Tournament (NIT) by winning all three games in the tournament. Additionally, this Temple squad reached the finals of the 1936 Olympic Trials.

Schedule and results

|-
!colspan=9 style="background:#9E1B34; color:#FFFFFF;"| Regular season

|-
!colspan=9 style="background:#9E1B34; color:#FFFFFF;"| National Invitation Tournament

Source

References

Temple Owls men's basketball seasons
National Invitation Tournament championship seasons
NCAA Division I men's basketball tournament championship seasons
Temple
Temple
Temple Owls Men's Basketball Team
Temple Owls Men's Basketball Team